Kirinyaga may refer to:

 Kirinyaga (novel), by Mike Resnick
 "Kirinyaga" (short story), a 1988 short story by Mike Resnick
 Kirinyaga County, Kenya
 Kirinyaga University
 Mount Kenya